.gu is the Internet country code top-level domain (ccTLD) for Guam.

Registrations are free of charge but are limited to people or companies with a contact in Guam, and are limited to third-level registrations beneath second-level names such as .com.gu.  There has not been very much use of .gu addresses.

Second level domains
There are five Second Level Domains:
 com.gu: Commercial Entities 
 net.gu: Network Service Providers
 gov.gu: Government
 org.gu: Non-commercial Organizations 
 edu.gu: Education

See also
Internet in Guam
Internet in the United States
.us

External links
 IANA .gu whois information
 Guam NIC (old site)

Country code top-level domains
Communications in Guam
1994 establishments in Guam

sv:Toppdomän#G